The 1990 Detroit riot occurred on June 14, 1990 after the Detroit Pistons defeated the Portland Trail Blazers in the 1990 NBA Finals. The rioting resulted in 8 deaths and is one of the worst sports-related riots in American history.

The riot 
On June 14, 1990, the Detroit Pistons defeated the Portland Trail Blazers 92–90 in Game 5 of the 1990 NBA Finals. The game was played at the  Memorial Coliseum in Portland, but over 21,000 Pistons fans watched the game on big screen TVs at The Palace of Auburn Hills, the Pistons' home court. The event at The Palace remained peaceful, with only one arrest occurring.

The game ended at 11:30 EDT and rioting quickly began afterwards. Looting was reported throughout city and at least 124 people were hospitalized for injuries, including 26 who had been shot, two had been stabbed and over a dozen who were beaten in front of riot police. Eight people were killed as well  10-year-old Keith Brown, 9-year-old Frederick Moore, 15-year-old Alisha Stanfield and 21-year-old Sonny Deon Hogan were struck and killed after being struck by a Ford Thunderbird in front of a convenience store where they were celebrating. 41-year-old Bruce Burdett Thomas of Warren was charged with four counts of second-degree murder in connection with the incident. Several witness described the crash as deliberate. 19-year-old Michael Wilkins was shot and killed after an argument occurred in a parking lot, a 21-year-old man fell off a roof to his death and two other, pedestrians, one of them a 4-year-old boy, were killed in other auto accidents. A total of 141 people were arrested in Detroit.  

The rioting spread to suburb areas. In River Rouge, 28 youths were arrested after they smashed the windows of several stores and a police car. In Roseville, a police car was pelted with beer cans and bottles, though no one was arrested.

The Pistons had won the NBA championship the year prior and little violence occurred, though violence occurred after the Detroit Tigers won the World Series in 1984. The rioting was the worst the city had experienced since the uprising of 1967.

See also
 Chicago Bulls Championship riots

References

1990 in sports in Michigan
1990 in Detroit
1990 crimes in the United States
1990 riots
Detroit Pistons
Hooliganism
June 1990 events in the United States
1990
Sports riots